Pallqa K'ark'a (Aymara pallqa bifurcation, k'ark'a crevice, fissure, crack, "bifurcation crevice", also  spelled Palca Karka) is a  mountain in the Cordillera Real in the Andes of Bolivia. It is situated in the La Paz Department, Larecaja Province, in the south-west of the Guanay Municipality. Pallqa K'ark'a lies north-east of the mountain Chachakumani at the confluence of the rivers Ch'ijini (Chiquini) and Waraqu (Waraco).

References 

Mountains of La Paz Department (Bolivia)